Wicken  may refer to:

Places
 Wicken, Cambridgeshire, England
Wicken Lode and Wicken Fen are nearby
 Wicken, Northamptonshire, England
 Wicken Bonhunt, a village in Essex, England

People with the surname
 Elizabeth Wicken (1927–2011), Canadian baseball player

See also
 Wiccan, a practitioner of Wicca
 Wickens, surname
 Wickham (disambiguation)